Siphonaria is a genus of air-breathing sea snails or false limpets, marine pulmonate gastropod molluscs in the family Siphonariidae, the false limpets.

Distribution
This genus occurs worldwide in most tropical and temperate seas.

Species
According to the World Register of Marine Species (WoRMS), the following species are included in the genus Siphonaria 

 Siphonaria acmaeoides Pilsbry, 1894
 Siphonaria acuta Quoy & Gaimard, 1833
 Siphonaria aequilirata Carpenter, 1857
 Siphonaria aequilorata Reeve, 1856
 Siphonaria alba Hubendick, 1943
 Siphonaria albicante Quoy & Gaimard, 1833
 Siphonaria alternata Say, 1826
 Siphonaria alternicosta Potiez & Michaud, 1838
 Siphonaria asghar Biggs, 1958
 Siphonaria atra Quoy & Gaimard, 1833
 Siphonaria australis Quoy & Gaimard, 1833
 Siphonaria basseinensis Melvill, 1893
 Siphonaria belcheri Hanley, 1858
 Siphonaria bifurcata Reeve, 1856
 † Siphonaria bisiphites Michelin, 1831
 Siphonaria brannani Stearns, 1872
 Siphonaria brasiliana Reeve, 1856
 Siphonaria brunnea Hanley, 1858
 Siphonaria capensis Quoy & Gaimard, 1833
 Siphonaria carbo Hanley, 1858
 Siphonaria characteristica Reeve, 1842
 Siphonaria chirura Pilsbry, 1920
 Siphonaria compressa Allanson, 1958
 Siphonaria concinna Sowerby, 1830
 Siphonaria corallina Christiaens, 1980
 Siphonaria corrugata Reeve, 1856
 Siphonaria corrumbinensis Hubendick, 1955
 † Siphonaria costaria (Deshayes, 1824)
 Siphonaria costata G. B. Sowerby I, 1835
 † Siphonaria crassicostata Deshayes, 1861
 Siphonaria crenata de Blainville, 1827
 Siphonaria dayi Allanson, 1958
 Siphonaria denticulata Quoy & Gaimard, 1833
 Siphonaria diemenensis Quoy & Gaimard, 1833
 Siphonaria elatior Schrenck, 1867
 Siphonaria exulum Hanley, 1858
 Siphonaria ferruginea Reeve, 1856
 Siphonaria fuegiensis Güller, Zelaya & Ituarte, 2015
 Siphonaria funiculata Reeve, 1856
 Siphonaria gigas Sowerby, 1825 - giant false limpet
 † Siphonaria glabrata de Raincourt, 1876
 Siphonaria guamensis Quoy & Gaimard, 1833
 Siphonaria henica Verrill & Bush, 1900
 Siphonaria hispida Hubendick, 1946
 Siphonaria incerta Deshayes, 1863
 Siphonaria innocuus (Iredale, 1940)
 Siphonaria innominata (Iredale, 1915)
 † Siphonaria irregularis Sacco, 1897
 Siphonaria japonica (Donovan, 1824)
 Siphonaria javanica (Lamarck, 1819)
 Siphonaria jeanae Jenkins, 1984
 Siphonaria kurracheensis (Reeve, 1856)
 Siphonaria laciniosa (Linnaeus, 1758)
 Siphonaria laeviuscula G. B. Sowerby I, 1835
 Siphonaria lateralis Gould, 1846
 † Siphonaria laubrierei Cossmann, 1889
 Siphonaria lepida Gould, 1848
 Siphonaria lessonii Blainville, 1824
 † Siphonaria liancurtensis Cossmann, 1892
 Siphonaria lineolata G. B. Sowerby I, 1835
 Siphonaria macgillivrayi Reeve, 1856
 Siphonaria macquariensis (Powell, 1939)
 Siphonaria madagascarensis Ohdner, 1919
 Siphonaria maura Sowerby, 1835
 Siphonaria naufragum Stearns, 1872
 Siphonaria normalis Gould, 1846
 Siphonaria oculus Krauss
 Siphonaria parcicostata Deshayes, 1863
 Siphonaria parma Hanley, 1858
 Siphonaria pascua Rehder, 1980
 † Siphonaria paucidigitata Cossmann, 1907
 Siphonaria pectinata (Linnaeus, 1758) - striped false limpet
 Siphonaria percea (Iredale, 1940)
 Siphonaria pica G. B. Sowerby I, 1835
 Siphonaria pisangensis Hubendick, 1947
 Siphonaria placentula Menke, 1853
 Siphonaria plicata Quoy & Gaimard, 1833
 † Siphonaria polygona (Michelotti, 1847)
 Siphonaria propria Jenkins, 1983
 Siphonaria punctata Quoy & Gaimard, 1833
 Siphonaria raoulensis Oliver, 1915
 Siphonaria redimiculum Reeve, 1856
 Siphonaria rosea Hubendick, 1943
 Siphonaria rucuana Pilsbry, 1904
 Siphonaria savignyi Krauss, 1848
 Siphonaria serrata (Fischer von Waldheim, 1807)
 Siphonaria siquijorensis Reeve, 1856
 Siphonaria sirius Pilsbry, 1894
 † Siphonaria spectabilis Deshayes, 1861
 Siphonaria stellata (Helbling, 1779)
 Siphonaria stewartiana (Powell, 1939)
 Siphonaria subatra Pilsbry, 1904
 Siphonaria subrugosa G. B. Sowerby I, 1835
 Siphonaria tasmanica Tenison-Woods, 1876
 Siphonaria tenuis Philippi, 1860
 Siphonaria thersites Carpenter, 1864
 Siphonaria tongensis Hubendick, 1943
 † Siphonaria tournoueri Vasseur, 1881
 Siphonaria tristensis (Leach, 1824)
 † Siphonaria vasconiensis Michelin, 1831
 Siphonaria venosa Reeve, 1856
 Siphonaria viridis Quoy & Gaimard, 1833
 † Siphonaria vulcanica Harzhauser, Landau & Breitenberger, 2017
 Siphonaria williamsi Berry, 1969
 † Siphonaria xinglongtaiensis Youluo, 1978 
 Siphonaria zelandica Quoy & Gaimard, 1833

Taxa inquerenda
 Siphonaria adjacens W. H. Turton, 1932
 † Siphonaria alpinula Mayer, 1870
 Siphonaria angulata Gray, 1825
 Siphonaria becki W. H. Turton, 1932
 Siphonaria conica Blainville, 1827
 Siphonaria coreensis A. Adams & Reeve, 1848 (taxon inquirendum)
 Siphonaria depressa Pease, 1862
 Siphonaria depressior Schrenck, 1867
 Siphonaria fuliginata Reeve, 1856
 † Siphonaria granicosta Cossmann, 1895
 Siphonaria kowiensis W. H. Turton, 1932
 Siphonaria luzonica Reeve, 1856
 Siphonaria melanozonias (Gmelin, 1791)
 Siphonaria nigra Pallary, 1900
 Siphonaria oblivirgulata Hubendick, 1943
 Siphonaria opalescens Davis, 1904
 Siphonaria pallida Allanson, 1958
 Siphonaria palmata Carpenter, 1857
 Siphonaria palpebrum Reeve, 1856
 † Siphonaria penjinae Dall, 1893
 Siphonaria picta d'Orbigny, 1839
 Siphonaria plana Quoy & Gaimard, 1833 (nomen dubium)
 Siphonaria radiata Gray, 1824
 Siphonaria scabra Reeve, 1856
 Siphonaria sowerbyi Michelin, 1832
 † Siphonaria xinglongtaiensis Youluo, 1978
Species brought into synonymy
 Siphonaria adansonii de Blainville, 1827: synonym of Siphonaria pectinata (Linnaeus, 1758)
 Siphonaria algesirae Quoy & Gaimard, 1832: synonym of Siphonaria pectinata (Linnaeus, 1758)
 Siphonaria amara Reeve, 1856: synonym of Siphonaria normalis Gould, 1846
 Siphonaria amphibia W. R. B. Oliver, 1915: synonym of Siphonaria raoulensis W. R. B. Oliver, 1915
 Siphonaria anneae Tomlin, 1944: synonym of Siphonaria carbo Hanley, 1858
 Siphonaria aspera Krauss, 1848: synonym of Siphonaria serrata (Fischer von Waldheim, 1807)
 Siphonaria baconi Reeve, 1856: synonym of Siphonaria zelandica Quoy & Gaimard, 1833
 Siphonaria blainvillei Hanley, 1858: synonym of Siphonaria funiculata Reeve, 1856 (junior synonym)
 Siphonaria cancer Reeve, 1856: synonym of Siphonaria australis Quoy & Gaimard, 1833
 Siphonaria cheesemani W. R. B. Oliver, 1915: synonym of Siphonaria raoulensis W. R. B. Oliver, 1915
 Siphonaria cochleariformis Reeve, 1856: synonym of Siphonaria japonica (Donovan, 1824) (nomen dubium, doubtful synonym)
 Siphonaria cookiana Suter, 1909: synonym of Siphonaria australis Quoy & Gaimard, 1833
 Siphonaria cyaneomaculata (Sowerby III, 1906): synonym of Siphonaria concinna Sowerby I, 1823
 Siphonaria deflexa (Helbling, 1779): synonym of Siphonaria concinna G. B. Sowerby I, 1823
 Siphonaria grisea Gmelin: synonym of Siphonaria pectinata (Linnaeus, 1758)
 Siphonaria inculta Gould, 1846: synonym of Siphonaria australis Quoy & Gaimard, 1833
 Siphonaria intermedia Schrenck, 1867: synonym of Siphonaria sipho G. B. Sowerby I, 1823 accepted as Siphonaria javanica (Lamarck, 1819) (unavailable: not Siphonaria intermedia Murray, 1857)
 Siphonaria jonasi Dunker, 1853: synonym of Siphonaria pectinata (Linnaeus, 1758)
 Siphonaria lecanium Philippi, 1846: synonym of Siphonaria maura G. B. Sowerby I, 1835 (junior subjective synonym)
 Siphonaria lineolata d'Orbigny, 1842: synonym of Siphonaria pectinata (Linnaeus, 1758)
 Siphonaria macauleyensis W. R. B. Oliver, 1915: synonym of Siphonaria raoulensis W. R. B. Oliver, 1915
 Siphonaria mouret Sowerby G.B. I, 1825: synonym of Siphonaria pectinata (Linnaeus, 1758)
 Siphonaria mouretus de Blainville, 1824: synonym of Siphonaria pectinata (Linnaeus, 1758)
 Siphonaria natalensis Krauss, 1848: synonym of Siphonaria serrata (Fischer von Waldheim, 1807) (junior synonym)
 Siphonaria naufraga Stearns, 1872: synonym of Siphonaria pectinata (Linnaeus, 1758)
 Siphonaria nigerrima E. A. Smith, 1903: synonym of Siphonaria carbo Hanley, 1858
 Siphonaria nuttallii Hanley, 1858: synonym of Siphonaria normalis Gould, 1846
 Siphonaria obliquata G. B. Sowerby I, 1825: synonym of Benhamina obliquata (Sowerby I, 1825)
 Siphonaria palmata Carpenter, 1857: synonym of Siphonaria lecanium var. palmata Carpenter, 1857 (taxon inquirendum)
 Siphonaria redimiculum Reeve, 1856: synonym of Kerguelenella lateralis (Gould, 1846)
 Siphonaria sipho G.B. Sowerby I, 1830: synonym of Siphonaria javanica (Lamarck, 1819)
 Siphonaria stellata Blainville, 1827: synonym of Siphonaria laciniosa (Linnaeus, 1758)
 Siphonaria stowae Verco, 1906: synonym of Pugillaria stowae (Verco, 1906)
 Siphonaria striatocostata Dunker, 1846: synonym of Siphonaria pectinata (Linnaeus, 1758)
 Siphonaria tenuicostulata Smith: synonym of Siphonaria carbo Hanley, 1858
 Siphonaria variabilis Krauss, 1848: synonym of Siphonaria concinna Sowerby I, 1823
 Siphonaria virgulata Hedley, 1915: synonym of Siphonaria funiculata Reeve, 1856
 Siphonaria zebra Reeve, 1856: synonym of Siphonaria zelandica Quoy & Gaimard, 1833

References

Siphonariidae
Taxa named by George Brettingham Sowerby I